Deathstroke: Knights & Dragons is an American animated web series that was announced in May 2019 and premiered on January 6, 2020. Originally planned to air as a 12-episode web-series on CW Seed, these plans were canceled after the first episode appearing on CW Seed on January 6, 2020. The first episode that premiered and the 11 subsequent episodes planned to debut as a web series were later re-purposed into a direct-to-video animated film, Deathstroke: Knights & Dragons: The Movie, released digitally on August 4 and on Blu-ray on August 18, 2020. A second episode was eventually released 10 months later on November 24, 2020. While existing as a direct-to-video DC Animated film, like Batman Ninja it is considered a stand-alone entry that is not part of the DC Original Animated Universe series of films.

Cast and characters
 Michael Chiklis as Slade Wilson / Deathstroke
 Sasha Alexander as Adeline "Addie" Kane
 Griffin Puatu as Joseph Wilson / Jericho
 Asher Bishop as Young Joseph Wilson
 Castulo Guerra as General Suarez / Doctor
 Delbert Hunt as Bronze Tiger 
 Chris Jai Alex as Jackal
 Faye Mata as H.I.V.E. Queen / Jade
 Panta Mosleh as Lady Shiva / Nurse
 Colin Salmon as William Wintergreen
 Imari Williams as President / H.I.V.E. Pilot
 Minae Noji as Secretary of State
 Noshir Dalal as Kapoor

Episodes

Production
The series was announced in May 2019 titled Deathstroke: Knights & Dragons and would air on the CW Seed. It was planned to consist of 12 episodes, all written by J.M. DeMatteis and directed by Sung Jin Ahn.  The voice cast of the series was revealed late October alongside a teaser trailer which was released online.

Release
Deathstroke: Knights & Dragons premiered on January 6, 2020.

References

External links
 
 

2020 American television series debuts
2020 American television series endings
2020s American adult animated television series
American adult animated web series
American adult animated action television series
American adult animated adventure television series
American adult animated superhero television series
Adult animated television shows based on DC Comics
English-language television shows
Television series by Warner Bros. Animation
Television series by Blue Ribbon Content